Tommy Enuaraq is a published author and former territorial level politician from Clyde River, Nunavut, Canada.

He wrote a children's book Who's Going to Eat Me?. The book was published by Nortex in 1991.
Enuaraq ran for a seat in the Northwest Territories Legislature in the 1995 Northwest Territories general election. He won election in the electoral district of Baffin Central. Enuaraq ran for a seat in the Legislative Assembly of Nunavut after Nunavut was carved from the Northwest Territories in 1999. He was defeated in the new electoral district of Uqqummiut by David Iqaqrialu finishing second.

References

Members of the Legislative Assembly of the Northwest Territories
Living people
Canadian children's writers
People from Clyde River
Inuit from the Northwest Territories
Inuit politicians
Writers from Nunavut
Inuit writers
Inuit from Nunavut
Year of birth missing (living people)